Dude, You're Screwed (also known as Survive That!) is an American reality survival show which premiered on the Discovery Channel on December 8, 2013.

Premise
The show is a competition between survival experts who take turns dropping each other in dangerous areas of the world. For each episode the goal is to find civilization within 100 hours, using only the survival kit provided and whatever they can sneak in with them.

Hosts
The series is hosted by survival experts who also take turns being the contestant. The hosts are;
Casey Anderson - World class tracker and conservationist.
Matt Graham - Primitive skills specialist. Master of the atlatl.
John Hudson - Former helicopter pilot for the British Royal Air Force, John wrote the current SERE manual used by UK special forces.
Tom Moore - Served 16 years as a pathfinder in the US Army. Survival instructor.
Terry Schappert - United States Army National Guard Special Forces veteran.
Chris Swanda - Backwoods survivalist, preparedness expert, survival consultant.
Jake Zweig - Former US Navy Seal.

Episodes

Season 1

Season 2

References

External links 
 
 

2010s American reality television series
2013 American television series debuts
2014 American television series endings
Adventure reality television series
American adventure television series
Discovery Channel original programming
English-language television shows
Works about survival skills